The 1990 Dumfries and Galloway Regional Council election, the fifth election to Dumfries and Galloway Regional Council, was held on 3 May 1990 as part of the wider 1990 Scottish regional elections. The election saw the Independents' majority cut to 1 councillor, but enough to keep control of the 35 seat council.

Aggregate Results

Ward Results

References

1990 Scottish local elections
May 1990 events in the United Kingdom